Stefan Gödicke (born 20 January 1970) is a Swedish actor. He appeared in more than twenty films since 1997.

Selected filmography

References

External links 

1970 births
Living people
Swedish male film actors
Swedish male stage actors
21st-century Swedish male actors